Mourea  is a settlement in Rotorua Lakes within the Bay of Plenty Region of New Zealand's North Island.

It is located on a thin strip of land between Lake Rotorua and Lake Rotoiti, on State Highway 33.

Demographics
Mourea is part of the larger Rotoiti-Rotoehu statistical area.

Mourea had a population of 399 at the 2018 New Zealand census, an increase of 60 people (17.7%) since the 2013 census, and an increase of 24 people (6.4%) since the 2006 census. There were 126 households, comprising 198 males and 204 females, giving a sex ratio of 0.97 males per female, with 78 people (19.5%) aged under 15 years, 72 (18.0%) aged 15 to 29, 177 (44.4%) aged 30 to 64, and 72 (18.0%) aged 65 or older.

Ethnicities were 47.4% European/Pākehā, 68.4% Māori, 3.0% Pacific peoples, and 4.5% Asian. People may identify with more than one ethnicity.

Although some people chose not to answer the census's question about religious affiliation, 44.4% had no religion, 34.6% were Christian, 3.8% had Māori religious beliefs, 2.3% were Hindu and 6.0% had other religions.

Of those at least 15 years old, 60 (18.7%) people had a bachelor's or higher degree, and 57 (17.8%) people had no formal qualifications. 36 people (11.2%) earned over $70,000 compared to 17.2% nationally. The employment status of those at least 15 was that 150 (46.7%) people were employed full-time, 51 (15.9%) were part-time, and 24 (7.5%) were unemployed.

Marae

Mourea has three marae.

Taupiri Marae and Paruaharanui meeting house belongs to the Ngāti Pikiao hapū of Ngāti Paruaharanui. In October 2020, the Government committed $500,000 from the Provincial Growth Fund to upgrade the marae; it was expected to create 14 jobs.

Waiatuhi Marae and Kahumatamomoe meeting house is a meeting place for Ngāti Rongomai and the Ngāti Pikiao hapū of Ngāti Kahumatamomoe, Ngāti Paruaharanui and Ngāti Te Takinga.

Hohowai Marae includes two buildings: Te Takinga te whare tupuna and Hineora te wharekai.

References

Rotorua Lakes District
Populated places in the Bay of Plenty Region
Populated places on Lake Rotorua